Kadish (also Romanized as Kadīsh) is a village in Sefiddasht Rural District, in the Central District of Aran va Bidgol County, Isfahan Province, Iran. At the 2006 census, its population was 15, in 4 families.

References 

Populated places in Aran va Bidgol County